Blood & Water is a South African teen crime drama television series developed by Gambit Films for Netflix starring Ama Qamata, Khosi Ngema and Gail Mabalane. Set in Cape Town, the series follows a girl who transfers to an elite school when she suspects one of the students may be her sister, who was abducted as a baby.

The 6-episode first season was released on Netflix on 20 May 2020. In June 2020, Netflix renewed the series for a second season, which was released on 24 September 2021. A third season, announced in April 2022, premiered on 25 November 2022. The series won Best TV Drama at the 2021 South African Film and Television Awards as well as awards for cinematography and sound design.

Plot
The series revolves around Puleng (Ama Qamata), a high school girl whose sister Phume was kidnapped as part of a human trafficking network shortly after birth.  On the same day of Phume's birthday Puleng was invited to a party of Fikile Bhele (Khosi Ngema), a popular athlete studying at Parkhurst College, a prestigious school in Cape Town. After Wade (Dillon Windvogel), a new acquaintance points out their resemblance, Puleng starts to suspect that Fikile is Phume. She has lived in the shadow of her sister all her life so she decides to get to the bottom of things. She transfers to the elite school to investigate. While solving the puzzle, Puleng discovers that the mystery of her missing sister is not the only secret that her friends and family keep.

Cast

Main

Recurring
 Laura Bosman as Mrs. Joffe
 Andre Lombaard as Mr. Loots
 Baby Cele as Minister Dlamini
 Elzet Nel as Nate (seasons 1–2)
 Faniswa Yisa as Brenda Jaxa (seasons 1–2)
 Nasty C as Zhero (season 1)
 YoungstaCPT as himself (season 2)
 Ivan Botha as Hugo Ferreira (season 2)
 Ethan Brukman as Chase (season 3)
 Augusta Zietsman as Amber La Roux (season 3)

Episodes

Season 1 (2020)

Season 2 (2021)

Season 3 (2022)

Production

Development
In February 2019, it was announced Netflix had picked up their second South African original production after Queen Sono with a new teen drama from Gambit Films directed by Nosipho Dumisa and written by Daryne Joshua and Travis Taute. Bradley Joshua and Benjamin Overmeyer would produce.

In June 2020, Netflix renewed the series for a second season. The writers' room was expanded for the second season, and Thati Peele was added to the directing team.

On 6 April 2022, it was revealed the third season of the show was under production.

Casting

The cast was reported when filming for season 1 began, with a line-up of Ama Qamata, Khosi Ngema, Thabang Molaba, Dillon Windvogel, and Natasha Thahane. Gail Mabalane, Sello Maake, Arno Greeff, Ryle De Morny, Getmore Sithole, Xolile Tshabalala, Monique Rockman, and Cindy Mahlangu would also feature. Qamata was connected with the casting director through her work on Gomora.

Leroy Panashe Siyafa, Katishcka Chanderlal, and Alzavia Abrahams joined the cast for season 2 with Greteli Fincham promoted to a more central role.

Filming
Principal photography for the first season began on location in and around Cape Town in June 2019. Parts of the University of Cape Town made up the fictional Parkhurst College, such as Smuts Hall and Sarah Baartman Hall. Other filming locations included Cape Town City Hall, the Bay Hotel in Camps Bay, Sea Point promenade, the Atlantic Seaboard, Durbanville, and Llandudno. The swimming pool scenes were shot at Generations School in Somerset West.

Filming for the second season started 1 November 2020 and ended on 3 March 2021 in Cape Town. By the third season announcement in April 2022, filming had already commenced in Cape Town.

Release
A teaser trailer for the first season was released on 11 May 2020 followed by the official trailer on 15 May. All six episodes were available on Netflix from 20 May.

In August 2021, Netflix announced the season 2 release date with a teaser trailer as part of their September 2021 slate. A new official poster was also revealed. Netflix dropped the full trailer on 13 September. The seven episode second season was released on 24 September 2021.

In October 2022, Netflix officially announced that season 3 would be released on 25 November 2022 with a teaser trailer. This was followed by the full trailer on 9 November.

Reception

Critical and audience response
For season 1, Rotten Tomatoes reported an approval rating of 80% based on 5 reviews with an average rating of 6.5 out of 10. The series received attention from celebrities such as Gabrielle Union and Lil Nas X.

Awards and nominations

Notes

References

External links
 
 

2020 South African television series debuts
2020s crime drama television series
2020s teen drama television series
2020s South African television series
English-language Netflix original programming
Human trafficking in fiction
South African drama television series
Television series about teenagers
Television shows filmed in South Africa
Television shows set in Cape Town
Works about corruption